Sir Thomas Weston Johns Taylor,  (2 October 1895 – 29 August 1953) was an English chemist, academic, and university administrator.

He was the first Principal of the University College of the West Indies, serving from 1946 to 1952, and then Principal of the University College of the South West of England (later Exeter University) from 1952 until his death in 1953. He had previously been a Fellow of Brasenose College, Oxford (1920–1946) and a lecturer in organic chemistry at the University of Oxford (1927–1946). He saw active service in the British Army during both World Wars.

Early life and education
Taylor was born on 2 October 1895 in Little Ilford, Essex, England. He was educated at the City of London School, an all-boys private school in London. Having received a scholarship, he studied chemistry at Brasenose College, Oxford. His university studies were interrupted by military service during the First World War. He returned to Oxford after the war, and graduated with a first class Bachelor of Arts (BA) degree in 1920. He was later awarded a Doctor of Science (DSc) degree by the University of Oxford.

Military service

First World War
On 20 April 1915, having trained with the Officers Training Corps, Taylor was commissioned into the Essex Regiment as a second lieutenant (on probation). He was assigned to the 3rd Battalion, Essex Regiment. His commission and rank were confirmed in September 1915. He saw active service on the Western Front in France, and also at Gallipoli. He was wounded twice at Gallipoli.

Second World War
When the Second World War broke out, Taylor returned to the British Army, and was commissioned as a lieutenant on 14 January 1940. On 12 January 1941, he was assigned to the Royal Engineers and promoted to war substantive captain. He served in its chemical warfare branch, and was posted to the Middle East until 1943. While a temporary major, he was mentioned in despatches "in recognition of gallant and distinguished services in the Middle East during the period November 1941 to April 1942".

In 1943, Taylor moved to the United States where he had been appointed Director of the British Central Scientific Office (BCSO) in Washington, DC. The role of the BCSO was to undertake varied scientific research in relation to the war, and to cooperate with American scientists. He undertook research as varied as insecticides, paper parachutes, and shark repellents. Then, from 1944 to the end of the war, he was assigned to South East Asia Command as Head of the Operational Research Division.

Academic career
In 1920, Taylor was elected a Fellow of Brasenose College, Oxford; his alma mater. In 1927, he was additionally appointed a lecturer in organic chemistry at the University of Oxford. As a researcher he specialised in stereochemistry, but his made his name as an excellent teacher. He was a demonstrator in organic chemistry at the Dyson Perrins Laboratory. Among his students at Brasenose College was William Golding, who would move from studying science to literature and later won the Nobel Prize in Literature. Among those he supervised at Dyson Perrins Laboratory was Rosemary Murray; later Dame Rosemary and Vice-Chancellor of the University of Cambridge.

Following the end of the Second World War, Taylor moved into academic administration: he had learnt during the war that he was a very capable administrator. In 1946, he was selected as the first Principal of the University College of the West Indies in Jamaica. His duties involved building up the university college, establishing it in a difficult political climate, and solidifying its finances. He was successful, and was knighted for his efforts in 1952. He left the Caribbean to return to England, where he had been appointed Principal of the University College of the South West of England (later to become the University of Exeter) in July 1952.

Personal life
In 1922, Taylor married Rosamund Georgina Lloyd. They had no children.

On 29 August 1953, Taylor died suddenly while on holiday in Italy: he was 57 years old.

Honours
On 23 May 1946, Taylor was appointed a Commander of the Order of the British Empire (CBE) "for services to the forces". In the 1952 Queen's Birthday Honours, he was appointed a Knight Bachelor, and therefore granted the title sir, in recognition of his work as Principal of the University College of the West Indies. He was knighted by Queen Elizabeth II during a service at Buckingham Palace on 8 July 1952.

Selected works

References

External links

1895 births
1953 deaths
Military personnel from Essex
English chemists
Organic chemists
Fellows of Brasenose College, Oxford
Principals of the University College of the South West of England
Heads of the University of the West Indies
Essex Regiment officers
British Army personnel of World War I
Royal Engineers officers
British Army personnel of World War II
Knights Bachelor
Commanders of the Order of the British Empire
People from Essex (before 1965)
People educated at the City of London School
Alumni of Brasenose College, Oxford
Officers' Training Corps officers